Bharat Dutta Koirala, the winner of the 2002 Ramon Magsaysay Award for Journalism, Literature and Creative Communication Arts, is one of the most prominent senior journalists of Nepal with a professional career of over four decades. He started his career in journalism as the chief reporter of The Rising Nepal in 1965 and became editor of Gorkhapatra and executive chairman and general manager of Gorkhapatra Corporation. He is also the founder of many organizations such as Nepal Press Institute, Nepal Forum for Environmental Journalist, Media Services International, and Radio Sagarmatha, the first independent private FM radio station. Awarded the Knight International Press Fellowship Award by the International Center for Journalists in Washington, D.C. and the Ramon Magsaysay Foundation in Manila, Philippines, he also pioneered the publication of a Nepalese Wall Newspaper, and is credited with introducing reporting on development of rural Nepal. Presently, he is the Secretary General of Nepal Press Institute, Chairman of Media Services International, and Chairman of Himal Association. He is a prominent media teacher in Nepal who produces many professional journalists.

References

Living people
Nepalese journalists
Ramon Magsaysay Award winners
Year of birth missing (living people)